Campbell Island is an island in the Canadian province of British Columbia, located west of Denny Island and north of Hunter Island, near Milbanke Sound. The Inside Passage waterways of Lama Passage and Seaforth Channel meet at the northern end of Campbell Island.

The communities of Bella Bella and Campbell Island, just north of Bella Bella, are located on Campbell Island.  The same location is believed to have been that of Fort McLoughlin, an early Hudson's Bay Company post in the days of the Maritime Fur Trade, with the name McLoughlin Bay since conferred on the bay and a lake and a creek just south of where the settlement of Bella Bella is today (Old Bella Bella was on nearby Denny Island).

Campbell Island was probably named by Captain Pender during his 1866–69 surveys of the area, likely for a Dr. Campbell for whom also Campbell Point, on Loughborough Inlet, and Campbell River may also have been named. Dr. Samuel Campbell was ship's surgeon aboard  from 1857 to 1861. The Heiltsuk have traditionally occupied Campbell Island and depend on fishing as the primary industry.

References

Islands of British Columbia
Central Coast of British Columbia
Unincorporated settlements in British Columbia
Populated places in the Central Coast Regional District
Populated places on the British Columbia Coast
Range 3 Coast Land District